Rocky Point State Park is a passive use state park on Narragansett Bay in Warwick, Rhode Island. The land has been a public attraction since the mid-1800s, most notably as Rocky Point Amusement Park. When the amusement park closed in 1994, it sat abandoned for years until the city and state purchased the land in stages between 2008–2013. It reopened to the public as a state park in October 2014.

History 

Rocky Point has been a public attraction since the mid-1800s, located 10 miles from the state capital on a coastal point in Warwick, Rhode Island. William Winslow first began serving dinner and offering amusements when he purchased the land in 1847. By the middle of the 20th century, it was a very popular amusement park offering dozens of rides, including roller coasters, a log flume, Skyliner, Freefall, ferris wheel, and carousel. It was also home to the Shore Dinner Hall, a 4,000-seat food hall just outside the amusement park gates serving clamcakes, steamers, lobster, and New England clam chowder.

The park was owned by private interests throughout its history. Initially, steamboat captain William Winslow brought passengers there to dine or to use as a park. It was purchased from him in 1865 by Byron Sprague, and sold again in 1869 to the Continental Steamboat Company which brought Randall A. Harrington on to manage it. Harrington built up the popular space into a premier resort. Following a destructive fire in 1883, its character shifted to emphasizing rides, performances, sports, and other attractions. The park changed hands a few times but maintained its popularity throughout the 20th century. In the 1990s, its parent company struggled financially, and the park closed in November 1994. Many of the rides and attractions were sold, but much of the park sat abandoned for years, a popular site for vandals and urban explorers. It became a safety concern after multiple fires, eroding structures, and pervasive vandalism, and demolition of its remains began in May 2007.

Acquisition for public use 
The City of Warwick purchased 41 acres with state and federal funding in 2007, taking the title in August 2008. Rocky Point reopened to the public in June 2011, with a freshly paved walking path along the shore. Then-mayor of Warwick, Scott Avedisian, remarked that it was the first time in 80 years that an acre of shoreline was opened in the city for public use.

On election day in 2010, Rhode Island introduced a ballot measure to purchase the remaining 83 acres in and around the site, combining it with the 41 already owned in order to establish it as a state park. The measure passed by a vote ratio of nearly 2:1. The purchase was approved by the Small Business Administration in September 2012 and the last portion of land transferred to the state in March 2013.

The remaining buildings, including the Shore Dinner Hall, were demolished in summer 2014. Once completed, the space was cleaned, developed, and finally reopened as a state park on October 25, 2014.

Description 
Rocky Point is a passive use area, with most of the former amusement park now open space. A few structures from the amusement park remain, including the circa 1906 Circle Swing ride tower; the upper and lower stations and support towers from the Skyliner gondola ride; ruins of an old water tank; and a large arch by the entrance. The arch, which was originally one of 11 “Peace Through Understanding” arches for the 1964/65 World's Fair in Flushing, Queens, NY, was subsequently moved to Rocky Point in 1966, and underwent restoration in 2016. In the summer the park screens movies on its lawn and hosts a 5K run. In 2017 and 2018, the state park hosted Food Truck Nights. A large public fishing pier was opened in July 2020.

References

External links 

Rocky Point State Park on the State of Rhode Island Division of Parks & Recreation website

2014 establishments in Rhode Island
Rhode Island culture
State parks of Rhode Island
Warwick, Rhode Island
Protected areas of Kent County, Rhode Island
Protected areas established in 2014